"Practice What You Preach" is a song by American thrash metal band Testament, taken from their 1989 album Practice What You Preach. It was released as a promotional single to support the album. Due to being one of the band's most famous and popular songs, and for being one of the most frequently played songs at live concerts, "Practice What You Preach" can be considered to be Testament's signature song.

Live performances
"Practice What You Preach" is one of Testament's most played songs of all time, first played a month prior to the album's release, on July 1, 1989 in São Paulo, Brazil. As of 2015, the song has been performed over 500 times. Live versions of "Practice What You Preach" appear on the albums Live at the Fillmore, Live in London, and Dark Roots of Thrash.

Reception
"Practice What You Preach" received heavy rotation on MTV's Headbangers Ball.

Track listing

Personnel
 Chuck Billy – vocals
 Eric Peterson – guitars
 Alex Skolnick – guitars
 Greg Christian – bass
 Louie Clemente – drums

References

Testament (band) songs
1989 singles
Song recordings produced by Alex Perialas
Songs written by Chuck Billy (vocalist)
Songs written by Eric Peterson
Songs written by Alex Skolnick
Atlantic Records singles
Megaforce Records singles
1989 songs